Zoo in Budapest is a 1933 American Pre-Code romance/melodrama film directed by Rowland V. Lee and starring Loretta Young, Gene Raymond, O.P. Heggie, and Paul Fix. Gene Raymond, playing Zani, a young, mischievous man who has grown up only around the animals and the people that work and visit the zoo. Loretta Young plays Eve, who is an orphan who only wants to escape her situation and be out in the real world. O.P. Heggie plays Dr. Grunbaum, a father-like figure to Zani, as well as the zoo's doctor. The original 35mm prints of the film contained sequences tinted in amber or blue.

Produced by Jesse L. Lasky. Written by Melville Baker, Jack Kirkland, Dan Totheroh, Louise Long, and screenplay by Rowland V. Lee. With Oscar winning cinematographer Lee Garmes.

Plot

Flamboyant Zani (Gene Raymond) is a kindly young man who grew up entirely and works in the zoo in Budapest, Hungary. His only true friends are the zoo's animals, and indeed Zani has been chastised by his boss for being too nice to them. His dad was one of the finest caretakers of the animals, but unfortunately passed away early in Zani's life, and for his mother who died at childbirth, so Zani was raised with the animals that became his only friends. You also meet the other main character Eve (Loretta Young) a young and beautiful orphan girl. Eve must somehow escape from her strict orphan school, since she is faced with the prospect of being forced to work as an indentured servant (more like a slave) until she grows up.

At the beginning you get to meet and see a lot of the different animals that live at the zoo, and how people react to them. You meet a little boy named Paul, played by Wally Albright, who is with his harsh governess and all he wants to do is interact with the animals but he never gets the chance too. As you keep wondering throughout the zoo you meet Dr. Grunbaum, who is looking at a sick monkey. A woman then comes into the office of the zoo and says that her skunk fur has been stolen, and apparently hers isn't the first to go missing. She threatens to ruin the place if it is not found. The Dr. sends for Zani, who is playing with the lion cubs, and the officers escort him through the zoo where he spots the orphan girls that had come to the zoo, and these girls are all whispering to each other that Zani is there. Zani makes it back to the Dr's. office where they end up bonding over his father and Zani admits that he stole the furs. Dr. Grunbaum tries to punish him but he can't as Zani has headed out the door toward the orphan girls that just walked by. The Dr. assures the officer that he will not do it again.

As Zani gets closer to the girls he lets out a whistle tune and the girls automatically recognize its his. The girls move along to look at the ostriches, as the head of the orphanage reads a fact booklet to them. While the girls are walking though they start talking to Eve about if she wants to escape now would be the chance, but there is one girl that is strictly advising her against it and warns her of what could happen if she went through with it and got caught. Since Eve is 18 as of yesterday this might be her only chance to leave. They keep walking around the zoo when they come across the lions and Zani is standing in between them and the cage. Zani starts talking to the lion, but it is directed at Eve telling the lion to think of all the fun you could have if you were free, and that you just have to take that chance. After missing her first window to escape the girls send a signal to the girl at the front by touching the arm of the one in front of her. Once receiving that message the girl jumps over the railing and into the pond giving Eve the distraction she needed to escape. The girls around her give Eve different clothes and she runs off into the bushes.

After all of this Zani overhears a couple talking about wanting to buy the fox at the zoo so the wife can turn it into a muff. This angers Zani greatly and the first chance he gets shortly there after he steals the woman's fur. The woman and the man go to the office to report that her fur has been stolen, and immediately the officers and the Dr. know who did it.

After that realization you turn your attention back to Paul the little boy with his governess who escapes while getting on the bus all the while his governess is pre-occupied. You go straight back to the head of the Orphanage who is realizing as she counts that there is one missing, and that one would be Eve. Then you go back to the governess who realizes that the boy is missing and she alerts an officer who go's to look for him. You see the boy run away and back into the zoo another way, and the officers close up the gates to get in, but the head of the Orphanage informs them that there is still someone in there that is lost, but they assure her that everyone is out. She tells the officers that if they do find anyone in there to come get her immediately so she can grab Eve herself.

Going back to the stolen fur Dr. Grunbaum realizes that he has no choice but to turn Zani in. You then see Zani offering to help search for Eve. He eventually finds her in the bushes, but informs the officer that there's no one there, so he turns around and leaves. That is when Eve changes out of her uniform into normal clothes. After leading the officer astray Zani goes back to Eve and you find out they've cared for each other this entire time and the whistles were to let the other know they were near. They sit there for a while talking and eventually they kiss before heading off in a direction Zani knows they wont be caught. He takes her to an old bear den, that has a hole in it where you can look and see a view of the city. Leaving Eve alone to gather food for her you come to find out that the officers, who have all gathered at the zoo dinner, are all looking for either Zani, Paul, or Eve. Not being able to resist Zani enter the hospital and immediately jumps into action thinking of what they're going to do save the monkey the Dr. is trying to save and without a second though Zani goes and gets the solution of bringing in Maria who is the other monkey in the cage. He ends up saving the animal and Dr. Grunbaum temporarily forgets that he's having Zani arrested.

On Zani's way back to the den he picks up Mimi the monkey and takes her with him. When he gets there Eve is upset and is wondering what is going to happen tomorrow. and Zani is trying his best to comfort her. Meanwhile Paul's parents are worried and want to know where their son is, and a lot of officers have now arrived to look for these three. Back at the den you find out that Eve ran away for Zani and that Zani wanted her to run away for him. Eve says she thought they'd get married, and this takes Zani aback but realizing that hurt Eve when he did that he asks what they would do if that happened. She says that they would get a house somewhere just like others. After having a moment of happiness Eve find Paul hiding and crying near the den, because he thinks since he ran away he's gong to jail.

One of the other zookeepers finds the three in the den and Zani runs after him, but shortly after he starts running away from the officers. Zani gets caught and you realize that the other zookeeper is trying to have his way with Eve since Zani is gone, but Zani hears Eve's screams and escapes to run after her. He fights the other zookeeper off of Eve. Paul escapes and keeps running until he gets to an area where there is a strange man locked in a cage, because he was put earlier that night by one of the zookeepers. The strange man has Paul go and get the key and get him out of the cage but Paul accidentally does the wrong cage and lets loose the tiger. All the sudden with the tiger leaping around getting mad at the other animals making them excited all of the animals break out of their cage and start fighting with one another. This makes the little boy start to sob, someone hears him and they recognize it coming from the tiger, lion, and elephant area.

In a resourceful move Zani lowers himself to where Paul is so he can snatch him up and get him out of harms way, but after grabbing him one of the animals grabs hold of Zani's leg and he is left very injured. After getting the help of some hoses and a very smart elephant the Dr. gets the animals back into their cages. As Zani is getting taken away to the hospital Paul's father comes up to him and says thank you, and if there is anything I can do let me know. Zani then replies that he doesn't want the orphanage to take Eve away.

You fast forward a little bit and Paul's father, Mr. Vandor, played by Niles Welch, is at the orphanage arranging with the head that Eve is under his protection for the next five years, but it's not going to matter because she is marrying Zani tomorrow and they will live on his estate and Zani will look after his animals. The last shot you see is of Eve and Zani riding a horse and saying that they are home and they are just like the others.

Cast
 Loretta Young as Eve
 Gene Raymond as Zani
 O.P. Heggie as Dr. Grunbaum
 Wally Albright as Paul Vandor
 Paul Fix as Heinie
 Murray Kinnell as Garbosh
 Ruth Warren as Katrina
 Roy Stewart as Karl
 Frances Rich as Elsie
 Niles Welch as Mr. Vandor
 Lucille Ward as Miss Murst
 Russ Powell as Toski
 Dorothy Libaire as Rosita

Reception 
The film received good reviews almost all around when it premiered in 1933, with Rush from Variety saying it has "extreme beauty in its physical production and good action that will carry interest to the generality." While Denis from Billboard says that "this picture ought to please easily and should have no trouble in the box office."

Along with the cinematography, the romantic story was very well received, with Broadway and Hollywood Movies saying "The story teems with action, interludes of pathos and exquisitely beautiful romance."

References

External links
 
 
 
 
 

1933 films
1933 romantic drama films
American romantic drama films
1930s English-language films
American black-and-white films
Films about orphans
Films directed by Rowland V. Lee
Films set in Budapest
Films set in zoos
Fox Film films
1930s American films
Silent romantic drama films